The 1946 Washington State Cougars football team was an American football team that represented Washington State College in the Pacific Coast Conference (PCC) during the 1946 college football season. Second-year head coach Phil Sarboe led the Cougars to a 1–6–1 overall record (1–5–1 in PCC, eighth).

All three home games were played in October, on campus at Rogers Field in Pullman.

Schedule

NFL draft
Four Cougars were selected in the 1947 NFL Draft, held on December 16, 1946.

References

External links
 Game program: Idaho at WSC – October 5, 1946
 Game program: Washington at WSC – October 12, 1946
 Game program: Oregon State at WSC – October 26, 1946

Washington State
Washington State Cougars football seasons
Washington State Cougars football